Grekan is a village and a former municipality in the Elbasan County, central Albania. At the 2015 local government reform it became a subdivision of the municipality Belsh. The population at the 2011 census was 3,138. The municipal unit consists of the villages Deshiran, Grekan, Guras and Rrenes.

References

Administrative units of Belsh
Former municipalities in Elbasan County
Villages in Elbasan County